Piptocarpha is a genus of flowering plants in the daisy family. Ashdaisy is a common name for these plants.

References

Asteraceae genera